Reem Kassis (born 1987) is a Palestinian writer and cookbook author. Her work focuses on the intersection of food with culture, history and politics.

Early life 
Reem Kassis was born and raised in Jerusalem to a father from a Christian family from the Galilee and a mother from a Muslim family from the Triangle area.

She left Jerusalem at 17 to attend the University of Pennsylvania in Philadelphia where she earned her undergraduate degrees in business and international studies at the Huntsman Program. She earned her MBA from the Wharton School in 2010 and studied further at the London School of Economics obtaining an MSc in social psychology.

Career 
Prior to her career in writing, Kassis worked as a business consultant at McKinsey & Company. She also worked with the World Economic Forum and in executive search.  After the birth of her daughters, she decided to leave the business world and pursue a writing career.

Her first book, The Palestinian Table, was published in 2017 and nominated for a James Beard Award, won the Guild of Food Writers First Book Award, and was shortlisted for the Andre Simon Award and the Edward Stanford Award. It was also selected as one of NPRs best books of 2017. Her second book, The Arabesque Table, published in 2022 was hailed as one of the best cookbooks of the year by numerous outlets.

Kassis also writes on issues of culinary appropriation, food history and culture. Her works have appeared in The New York Times, The Atlantic, The Washington Post, The Wall Street Journal, The Los Angeles Times, Serious Eats, and other specialized publications.

Books

The Palestinian Table 
Her debut cookbook, The Palestinian Table, was published in October 2017 by Phaidon Press. The volume was aimed at preserving traditional Palestinian dishes and introducing Western readers to Palestinian cuisine and culture. In the preface Kassis wrote: “The Palestinian Table spans our entire geography from the mountains of the Galilee to the valleys of the south, from the coast of Yaffa all the way to the West Bank. It is scattered across the globe and built from memories of a time when most of us lived in the same land.” The Palestinian Table consists of 150 recipes, with photography, personal anecdotes, and origins of the dishes.

The reviews for The Palestinian Table were generally positive. NPR named it one of the best books of the year. The Guardian, The Independent, New York Magazine, Buzzfeed, San Francisco Chronicle, The National Post, Saveur Magazine, Departures, and Milk Street all listed the work in their lists of the best cookbooks published in 2017.  A journalist in the Institute for Palestinian Studies recommended the book for newcomers, calling Kassis “a humble guide who doesn’t dazzle with intimidating recipes”. Tanuahka Marah, the reviewer for the Morning Star described the photography as “stunning”. In her nomination for the Palestine Book Award, a critic praised the author's anecdotes for providing “valuable cultural insight as well as specifics about how the local dishes are prepared and served”. The late chef Anthony Bourdain praised the book saying, "With The Palestinian Table, Reem Kassis gracefully demonstrates the power of food to transcend the political divisions that are, too often, all we know of a place like Palestine. Reading and cooking from this essential book - a thoughtful collection of great recipes, historical and cultural insights, and beautiful photographs - will move you closer to understanding this complex, fascinating part of the world."

The Palestinian Table was short-listed for the Andre Simon Food and Drink Book Awards, the Edward Stanford Travel Writing Awards, and was a winner in the Eugenie Brazier awards in Lyon. The book also won the First Book award by the Guild of Food Writers. and was nominated for the James Beard Foundation Award in the International category.

The Arabesque Table 
The Arabesque Table was published in 2021 by Phaidon Press. The volume takes a much broader look at contemporary cooking from across the Arab world, tracing the evolving and cross cultural food of the region and showcasing the impact of Arab food on global cooking today.  The book had good critical reception with The New York Times, Eater, Food & Wine, Wired, CNN, WBUR, SFGATE, The National Post all listing the book as one of the best cookbooks published in 2021. Yotam Ottolenghi praised the book saying, "The Arabesque Table sees food, recipes and stories as part of the on-going conversation (and feast!) between cultures and their cuisines. It sees food, stories and the identities these things are linked to as fluid, receptive; not as static or fixed in one time or place. As a result, the book is full to the brim with dishes which are rooted in tradition and at the same time creatively (and deliciously!) transcend  it. I think it is wonderful!"

Following the publication of The Arabesque Table, Kassis was interviewed by  NPR's Terry Gross on Fresh Air.

Select works

Books 

 The Palestinian Table (Phaidon, 2017),  
 The Arabesque Table (Phaidon, 2021),

Newspaper Articles 

 "The Best Olive Oil in the World? This Village Thinks So." The New York Times (2021)
 "Do You Have Nafas, the Elusive Gift That Makes Food Taste Better?" The New York Times (2022)
 "Here’s why Palestinians object to the term ‘Israeli food’: It erases us from history," The Washington Post (2020)
 "Why we cook when the world doesn't make sense," The Los Angeles Times (2020)
 "Recipes for a Smaller Holiday Meal With Big Flavor," The Wall Street Journal (2020)
 "Cook and writer Reem Kassis on the Galilee," The Financial Times (2017)

Websites & Magazines 

 "National Cuisine Is a Useful Illusion," The Atlantic (2022)
 Ka'ak and Ma'amoul Are the Sweets That Connect My Family Through Joy and Sorrow," Food & Wine (2021)
 "Ka’ak, and the Case for the Ancient Arabic Origins of the Bagel," Serious Eats (2021)
 "Stop Fighting for Gender Equality... Start Demanding Respect," HuffPost (2016)

Fiction 

 "Farradiya - A Short Story," Kweli Journal (2019)

Personal life 

Kassis is married to Albert Muaddi. The couple have two daughters and live in Philadelphia.

References 

Palestinian emigrants to the United States
Palestinian writers
Palestinian women writers
Living people
1987 births
Palestinian chefs
University of Pennsylvania alumni
Wharton School of the University of Pennsylvania alumni
Alumni of the London School of Economics